Group Captain Paul Ward Spencer Bulman,  (8 April 1896 – 6 May 1963), universally known as George Bulman, was a pilot whose flying life spanned thirty years (1915–1945).

Early years
Bulman was born in Luton in 1896, the son of the Reverend Canon Thomas Bulman, a Church of England clergyman, and his wife Eveline. He was educated at Bedford School and then joined the Bank of England.

First World War
He transferred from the Honourable Artillery Company to the Royal Flying Corps (later Royal Air Force) early in the First World War, serving in No. 46 Squadron RFC and No. 3 Squadron RFC.

He was awarded the Military Cross on 4 February 1918 for his services flying Sopwith Camels at the Battle of Courtrai, with the following citation:
For conspicuous gallantry and devotion to duty. On five occasions; in most difficult weather conditions, he dropped bombs and fired on enemy infantry from a low altitude, inflicting heavy casualties. During these flights he frequently obtained valuable information, and twice drove off enemy machines which attempted to interfere. He showed the greatest initiative and resource.

He was appointed a flight commander on 24 February 1918 with the temporary rank of captain, although his substantive rank was still second lieutenant. Later that year, he was awarded the Air Force Cross (AFC).

Between the wars
Appointed to a permanent RAF commission, he served as a test pilot on the Sopwith Snipe and the S.E.5a, and then served at the Royal Aircraft Establishment, Farnborough, from 1919 to 1925. On 12 July 1920, he was awarded a bar to his Air Force Cross for his services as a test pilot. He then held the rank of flying officer. He also undertook testing work for Blackburn and was one of the few pilots to fly the prototype Brennan helicopter in 1922. As a flight lieutenant, he was awarded a second bar to his Air Force Cross in the 1922 Birthday Honours. In 1924, he won the Grove Prize for aeronautical research.

On 19 August 1925, he resigned his permanent commission and transferred to the reserve as a flight lieutenant to become the chief test pilot at H. G. Hawker Engineering (later Hawker Aircraft) from 1925 to 1945 and became a director of the company in 1935. He became a close colleague of the company's chief designer, Sir Sydney Camm. He won several air races in the mid-1920s flying the Hawker Cygnet.

He made the first flight for the Hawker Danecock (1925), Hawker Heron (1925), Hawker Horsley (1925), Hawker Hart (1928), Hawker Tomtit (1928), Hawker F.20/27 (1928), Hawker Demon (1933), Hawker Hurricane (1935), and Hawker Hector (1936), and also tested many other types.

Second World War
During the Second World War, from 1941 to 1942, he was head of the Aircraft Testing Branch of the British Air Commission in Washington, D.C. and was granted an honorary RAF commission as a group captain on 9 May 1941, relinquishing it on 23 August 1942. For this work, he was appointed Commander of the Order of the British Empire (CBE) in the 1943 New Year Honours.

Post-war
He retired from Hawker in 1945 and never flew again, running his own business which had no relevance to aircraft. He finally resigned his RAF reserve commission on 10 February 1954.

Family
He married Constance Dorothy Wiseman in 1920. Their only child, Flying Officer Raymond Paul Bulman, was killed in action over Germany in 1945, aged 21, flying with No. 605 Squadron RAF.

Footnotes

References

1896 births
1963 deaths
Honourable Artillery Company soldiers
Royal Flying Corps officers
Royal Air Force group captains
British Army personnel of World War I
Royal Air Force personnel of World War I
Royal Air Force personnel of World War II
English test pilots
Commanders of the Order of the British Empire
Recipients of the Military Cross
People from Luton
Hawker Siddeley
Recipients of the Air Force Cross (United Kingdom)
Fellows of the Royal Aeronautical Society
People educated at Bedford School
People associated with the Bank of England
British World War I pilots
20th-century English businesspeople
Military personnel from Bedfordshire